Harry Bertram Singleton (1877 – 5 July 1948) was an English professional footballer who played as a winger.

References

1877 births
1948 deaths
Sportspeople from Prescot
English footballers
Association football wingers
Stockport County F.C. players
Bury F.C. players
Everton F.C. players
Grimsby Town F.C. players
Gillingham F.C. players
Queens Park Rangers F.C. players
Leeds City F.C. players
Huddersfield Town A.F.C. players
English Football League players